Adavi is a major tourist destination in Konni,
Kerala situated in the banks of Kallar river. Eco-tourism project in Adavi is jointly launched by Kerala Tourism Development Corporation and Department of Forests and Wildlife, Kerala.

The main attraction in Adavi is Coracle riding and Bamboo huts, which erected in the banks of Kallar river.

References

External links
 Adavi Package 
 Official website

Cities and towns in Pathanamthitta district
Tourism in Kerala